Guling may refer to these towns in China:

Guling, Chongqing (故陵), in Yunyang County, Chongqing
Guling, Guangxi (古零), in Mashan County, Guangxi
Guling, Jiujiang (牯岭), in Lu Mountain, Jiujiang

See also
 Gulin (disambiguation)